Yelken Octuri is a French designer born in 1970 whose work includes aircraft design, product design, and furniture design. He designed a yacht to go in air and water. He is from France and works as a cabin designer for Airbus.
Octuri was designated as one of the most innovative people of the year in 2011 by TIME magazine.

Aircraft of the future
Octuri has created five types of futuristic aircraft:
 City planes
 Flagellum oscillator
 Flying yacht
 Honeymoon space shuttle
 Sailing aircraft

The yacht design includes a bullet shaped hull for travel through water and air, along with four 40 meter "towering" sails that fold down into wings. The yacht is 46 meters long with four masts. It was exhibited at the French Air and Space Museum.

Further reading
Am-publishing / Apex Manual - China - April 2011
Azothmedia - China - July 2011
Avantages / Groupe marie-Claire - France - June 2010
Barche a Motore - Panama Editore - Italy - February 2011
Beards Magazine / Area Magazine  - England - March 2011
Black Card / Lifestyle magazine - Brazil - January 2011
ShowBoats International & The Megayachts / Boat International Media - USA - August 2011
BOOTE EXCLUSIV / Superyacht magazine - Germany - October 2010
Capital - Italy - December 2010
Departures - Russia - October 2010
Domus Magazine - Russia - December 2010
Yacht Turkiye - Turkey - September 2010
El mercurio - Chili - September 2010
Essence Magazine - China - August 2011
Veto / Veto Media S.A - Greece - August 2010
FHM magazine - South Africa - August 2010
Forbes - Turkey - October 2010
Gazzetta - Ukrainia - September 2010
K Magazine / Kathimerini - Greece - August 2010
Harmonies /Architecture, decoration and design - Lebanon - October 2010
Helix Magazine - Egypt - August 2011
Helm Superyacht Asia Pacific - Thailand - September 2010
Herald Tribune - USA - September 2010
Naver - Korea - November 2010
Le Fourquet / Milenio Group - Mexico - August 2010
JET Asia-Pacific / Blu Inc Media - China - June 2010
Jetgala - Australia - December 2010
Le Grand Mag - Spain - July 2011
Les Débrouillard - Canada - September 2010
LUHHO Magazine - Peru - August 2010
Marine & Océans - Belgium - October 2010
Máxima Interiores - Portugal - October 2010
Multicoques Magazine / Multihulls World - France - September 2010
Mundoejecutivo - Mexico - November 2010
Mundoyate magazine - Spain - May 2011
Naviga magazine - Turkey - November 2010
Néoplanète magazine - France - July 2010
Newlook magazine - France - June 2010
New York Times - USA - September 2010
Novy Cas / Slovakia Ringier Axel Springer - Slovakia - June 2011
OCEAN Magazine - Australia - July 2010
Latitude / ONE°15 Marina Club - Singapore - October 2010
Pacific Flyer - Australia - August 2010
Paris Match - France - January 2011
PLAYBOY magazine - Ukraine - August 2010
Popular Mechanics magazine - Russia - August 2010
Prestige magazine - Singapore - August 2010
Quo magazine - Spain - December 2010
Robb Report - Spain - September 2010
SAIL Magazine - USA - September 2010
Soundings - USA - November 2010
Sphere / the luxury travel and lifestyle magazine - UK - September 2010
STYLE Magazine - China - January 2011.
SuperyachtDesign / The Yacht Report Group - UK- August 2010
SuperYacht World magazine - UK - October 2010
Veja magazine - Brazil - October 2010
Voiles et Voiliers magazine - France - September 2010
WENN's / World Entertainment News - January 2011
Yacht Magazine / Ship and marine equipment magazine - China - March 2011
Yacht Turkiye - Turkey - October 2010
YachtExpert Magazine - Romania - September 2010
Yachting & Lifestyle magazine - Bulgaria - December 2010
Zefir - Ukraine - October 2010

References

External links
 
 Boat Newspaper
 Luxuries Newspaper
 French Newspaper L'Usine Nouvelle
 Automotto magazine
 Sea sail surf magazine
 Men's Up magazine

French industrial designers
Living people
Year of birth missing (living people)